WYMM (1530 AM, "Caribbean Power Radio") is a radio station in Jacksonville, Florida, broadcasting a Caribbean-language format. WYMM 1530 and 96.5 is branded as "Caribbean Power Radio", targeting Jacksonville's caribbean and Haitian community. WYMM is owned by locally owned AVM Broadcasting LLC. Prior to March 2014, it was "La Poderosa", playing a Regional Mexican music format.

WYMM operates with 50,000 watts, the maximum power for AM stations permitted by the Federal Communications Commission.  WYMM's transmitter, studios and offices are on Picketville Road in the Biltmore neighborhood of Jacksonville.

References

External links
https://www.facebook.com/caribbeanpower965/

YMM
1987 establishments in Florida
Radio stations established in 1987